List of unincorporated communities in the U.S. state of Kansas, sorted by county.

On the right is a clickable map of the counties in Kansas.

Allen County
 Bayard
 Carlyle
 Geneva
 Leanna
 Mildred†
 Petrolia

Anderson County
 Bush City
 Glenlock
 Harris
 Mont Ida
 Scipio
 Selma
 Welda

Atchison County
 Arrington
 Cummings
 Eden
 Farmington
 Good Intent
 Kennekuk
 Larkinburg
 Monrovia
 Oak Mills
 Parnell
 Port Williams
 Potter
 St. Pats
 Shannon

Barber County
 Aetna
 Deerhead
 Eldred
 Elm Mills
 Forest City
 Gerlane
 Lake City
 Mingona
 Pixley
 Stubbs

Barton County
 Beaver
 Boyd
 Dubuque
 Dundee
 Heizer
 Hitschmann
 Odin
 Redwing
 South Hoisington
 Stickney

Bourbon County
 Barnesville
 Berlin
 Devon
 Garland
 Godfrey
 Hammond
 Harding
 Hiattville
 Marmaton
 Pawnee Station
 Porterville
 Xenia

Brown County
 Baker
 Mercier
 Padonia
 Kickapoo Site 1
 Kickapoo Site 2
 Kickapoo Site 5
 Kickapoo Site 6
 Kickapoo Site 7
 Kickapoo Tribal Center
 Ioway Reservation
 Kickapoo Indian Reservation of Kansas
 Sac and Fox Reservation

Butler County
 Beaumont 
 Bois d'Arc 
 Brainerd 
 De Graff 
 Gordon 
 Haverhill
 Keighley
 Lorena
 Midian
 Pontiac
 Rosalia
 Wingate

Chase County
 Bazaar
 Clements
 Saffordville
 Toledo
 Wonsevu

Chautauqua County
 Cloverdale
 Grafton
 Hale
 Hewins
 Monett
 Osro
 Rogers
 Wauneta

Cherokee County
 Carona
 Cokedale
 Crestline
 Daisy Hill
 Empire City
 Faulkner
 Hallowell
 Keelville
 Kniveton
 Lawton
 Lowell
 Mackie
 Melrose
 Neutral
 Quaker
 Riverton
 Sherman
 Sherwin
 Skidmore
 Stippville
 Turck
 Treece

Cheyenne County
 Wheeler

Clark County
 Sitka

Clay County
 Idana
 Industry
 Ladysmith

Cloud County
 Ames
 Hollis
 Huscher
 Rice
 St. Joseph

Coffey County
 Agricola
 Aliceville
 Halls Summit
 Jacobs Creek Landing
 Ottumwa
 Sharpe

Comanche County
 Buttermilk

Cowley County
 Akron
 Floral
 Grand Summit
 Hackney
 Hooser
 Kellogg
 Maple City
 New Salem
 Rock
 Silverdale
 Tisdale
 Vinton
 Wilmot

Crawford County
 Beulah
 Brazilton
 Capaldo
 Cato
 Chicopee†
 Coalvale
 Croweburg†
 Curranville
 Dry Wood
 Dunkirk
 Englevale
 Farlington†
 Fleming
 Franklin†
 Fuller
 Greenbush
 Gross
 Kirkwood
 Klondike
 Kniveton‡
 Litchfield
 Lone Oak
 Midway
 Monmouth
 Opolis†
 Radley†
 Red Onion
 Ringo†
 South Radley
 Yale†

Decatur County
 Allison
 Cedar Bluffs
 Kanona
 Leoville
 Lyle
 Traer

Dickinson County
 Acme
 Buckeye
 Detroit
 Dillon
 Elmo
 Holland
 Industry
 Lyona
 Moonlight
 Navarre
 Pearl
 Shady Brook
 Stoney
 Sutphen
 Talmage
 Upland

Doniphan County
 Bendena
 Blair
 Brenner
 Doniphan
 Fanning
 Iowa Point
 Moray
 Palermo
 Purcell
 Sparks

Douglas County
 Big Springs
 Black Jack
 Clearfield
 Clinton
 Globe
 Grover
 Hesper
 Kanwaka
 Lake View
 Lone Star
 Midland
 Pleasant Grove
 Sibleyville
 Stull
 Vinland
 Worden

Edwards County
 Centerview
 Fellsburg
 Nettleton
 Trousdale

Elk County
 Busby
 Oak Valley

Ellis County
 Antonino
 Catharine
 Chetolah
 Emmeram
 Munjor
 Pfeifer
 Toulon
 Turkville
 Walker
 Yocemento

Ellsworth County
 Black Wolf
 Carneiro
 Langley
 Terra Cotta
 Venango
 Yankee Run

Finney County
 Eminence
 Friend
 Gano
 Kalvesta
 Lowe
 Mansfield
 Peterson
 Pierceville
 Plymell
 Quinby
 Ravanna
 Ritchal
 Rodkey
 Tennis
 Wolf

Ford County
 Bellefont
 Bloom
 Fort Dodge
 Howell
 Kingsdown
 South Dodge
 Wilroads Gardens
 Windthorst
 Wright

Franklin County
 Centropolis
 Homewood
 Imes
 LeLoup
 Norwood
 Peoria
 Ransomville
 Richter

Geary County
 Pawnee
 Wreford
 Fort Riley

Gove County
 None

Graham County
 Nicodemus
 Penokee
 St. Peter

Grant County
 Hickok
 Ryus
 Stano
 Sullivans Tracks

Gray County
 Charleston
 Haggard

Greenwood County
 Ivanpah
 Lamont
 Neal
 Piedmont
 Quincy
 Reece
 Thrall
 Tonovay
 Utopia

Hamilton County
 Kendall

Harper County
 Corwin
 Crystal Springs
 Duquoin
 Freeport
 Runnymede

Harvey County
 McLain
 Patterson
 Putnam
 Zimmerdale

Haskell County
 None

Hodgeman County
 None

Jackson County
 Birmingham
 Larkinburg

Jefferson County
 Boyle
 Buck Creek
 Dunavant
 Grantville
 Half Mound
 Lakeside Village
 Medina
 Mooney Creek
 Newman
 Rock Creek
 Thompsonville
 Williamstown

Jewell County
 Ionia
 Lovewell
 Montrose
 North Branch
 Otego

Johnson County
 Bonita
 Clare
 Clearview City
 Ocheltree
 Stilwell
 Wilder

Kearny County
 None

Kingman County
 Belmont
 Calista
 Cleveland
 Midway
 Mount Vernon
 Murdock
 Rago
 Skellyville
 St. Leo
 Varner
 Waterloo
 Willowdale

Kiowa County
 Belvidere
 Brenham
 Joy
 Wellsford

Labette County
 Angola
 Dennis
 Montana
 Strauss
 Valeda

Lane County
 Alamota
 Amy
 Healy
 Pendennis
 Shields

Leavenworth County
 Fairmount
 Fall Leaf
 Fort Leavenworth 
 Hoge
 Jarbalo
 Kickapoo
 Lowemont
 Millwood
 Reno
 Wadsworth

Lincoln County
 Ash Grove
 Denmark
 Shady Bend
 Vesper
 Westfall

Linn County
 Cadmus
 Centerville
 Critzer
 Farlinville
 Mantey
 Trading Post

Logan County
 Monument
 Page City

Lyon County
 Miller
 Plymouth

Marion County
 Antelope
 Aulne
 Canada
 Eastshore†
 Marion County Lake
 Pilsen†

Marshall County
 Bremen
 Herkimer
 Home
 Lillis
 Marietta
 Vliets

McPherson County
 Conway
 Elyria
 Groveland
 Johnstown
 New Gottland
 Roxbury

Meade County
 Missler

Miami County
 Beagle
 Block
 Bucyrus
 Hillsdale
 Jingo
 New Lancaster
 Somerset
 Stanton
 Wagstaff
 Wea

Mitchell County
 Asherville 
 Solomon Rapids

Montgomery County
 Bolton
 Jefferson 
 Sycamore
 Wayside

Morris County
 Burdick
 Delavan
 Diamond Springs
 Skiddy

Morton County
 Wilburton

Nemaha County
 Baileyville
 Berwick
 Capioma
 Kelly
 Neuchatel
 St. Benedict
 Woodlawn

Neosho County
 Kimball
 Leanna
 Morehead
 Odense
 Rollin
 Shaw
 South Mound
 Urbana

Ness County
 Arnold
 Beeler

Norton County
 Calvert
 Dellvale
 Densmore
 Oronoque
 Reager

Osage County
 Barclay
 Michigan Valley
 Peterton
 Vassar

Osborne County
 Bloomington
 Corinth
 Covert
 Forney
 Vincent

Ottawa County
 Ada
 Lindsey
 Niles
 Sumnerville
 Verdi
 Wells

Pawnee County
 Ash Valley
 Frizell
 Sanford
 Zook

Phillips County
 Gretna
 Stuttgart
 Woodruff

Pottawatomie County
 Blaine
 Duluth
 Flush
 Fostoria
 Saint Clere
 Swamp Angel

Pratt County
 Cairo
 Croft
 Hopewell
 Natrona

Rawlins County
 Blakeman
 Ludell
 Midway

Reno County
 Castleton
 Darlow
 Huntsville
 Lerado
 Medora
 Yaggy
 Yoder

Republic County
 Harbine
 Kackley
 Norway
 Rydal
 Talmo
 Wayne

Rice County
 Mitchell
 Pollard
 Saxman
 Silica

Riley County
 Bala
 Fort Riley
 Keats
 Lasita
 May Day
 Walsburg
 Winkler
 Zeandale

Rooks County
 Codell
 Webster

Rush County
 Hargrave
 Loretta
 Nekoma
 Schaffer

Russell County
 Dubuque
 Fairport  
 Milberger

Saline County
 Bavaria
 Bridgeport
 Falun
 Glendale
 Hedville
 Kipp
 Mentor
 Salemsborg
 Shipton

Scott County
 Chevron
 Grigston
 Hutchins
 Manning
 Modoc
 Pence
 Shallow Water

Sedgwick County
 Anness 
 Bayneville 
 Berwet 
 Clonmel 
 Furley 
 Greenwich 
 Greenwich Heights 
 Murray Gill 
 Peck
 Prospect 
 St. Marks 
 St. Mary Aleppo 
 St. Paul 
 Schulte 
 Sunnydale 
 Waco 
 Wego
 McConnell AFB
 Oaklawn-Sunview

Seward County
 Hayne

Shawnee County
 Berryton
 Dover
 Elmont
 Kiro
 Montara
 Pauline
 Tecumseh
 Wakarusa
 Watson

Sheridan County
 Angelus
 Seguin
 Studley
 Tasco

Sherman County
 Caruso
 Edson
 Ruleton

Smith County
 Bellaire
 Claudell
 Dispatch
 Harlan
 Reamsville
 Thornburg
 Womer

Stafford County
 Dillwyn
 Neola
 Zenith

Stanton County
 Big Bow
 Julian
 Saunders

Stevens County
 None

Sumner County
 Adamsville
 Anson
 Ashton
 Cicero
 Corbin
 Dalton
 Drury
 Ewell
 Millerton
 Milton
 Peck
 Perth
 Portland
 Riverdale
 Zyba

Thomas County
 Halford
 Levant†
 Mingo

Trego County
 Ogallah
 Riga
 Voda

Wabaunsee County
 Bradford
 Keene
 Newbury
 Volland
 Wabaunsee
 Wilmington

Wallace County
 Weskan

Washington County
 Hopewell
 Lanham

Wichita County
 Coronado
 Lydia
 Marienthal
 Selkirk

Wilson County
 Buxton
 Lafontaine
 Rest
 Roper
 Vilas

Woodson County
 Cookville
 Durand
 Piqua
 Vernon

Wyandotte County
 Turner
 Piper

See also
 List of counties in Kansas
 List of townships in Kansas
 List of cities in Kansas
 List of census-designated places in Kansas
 List of ghost towns in Kansas
 Lists of places in Kansas
 Kansas locations by per capita income
 Kansas census statistical areas
 Kansas license plate county codes

Kansas
Unincorporated communities